José Lionn Barbosa de Lucena (born 29 January 1989), known as Lionn, is a Brazilian professional footballer who plays as a right-back.

Club career

Early years and V. Guimarães
Born in Fortaleza, Ceará, Lionn spent his entire professional career in Portugal, signing with S.C.U. Torreense as an 18-year-old from Ferroviário Atlético Clube (CE). In 2008 he joined Vitória S.C. from the Primeira Liga, making his debut in the competition on 8 December in a 1–0 home win against Leixões S.C. where he played the full 90 minutes.

During his spell at the Estádio D. Afonso Henriques, Lionn was also loaned to fellow league teams S.C. Olhanense and Rio Ave FC.

Cluj and Rio Ave
Ahead of the 2011–12 season, Lionn moved to the Romanian Liga I with CFR Cluj. One year later, he was loaned to former club Rio Ave.

Lionn scored his first goal in the Portuguese top division – and second as a professional – on 25 August 2013, helping the hosts defeat Vitória F.C. 2–0. In the 2015–16 campaign, he started in 27 of his 28 league appearances as Rio Ave finished in sixth position, qualifying for the UEFA Europa League for the second time in its history. Subsequently, as his link was about to expire, he renewed his contract.

Later career
On 17 September 2018, Lionn signed a two-year deal with G.D. Chaves. After his team's relegation he continued in the Portuguese top tier, joining newly promoted F.C. Famalicão on a two-year contract.

Honours
CFR Cluj
Liga I: 2011–12

References

External links

1989 births
Living people
Sportspeople from Fortaleza
Brazilian footballers
Association football defenders
Ferroviário Atlético Clube (CE) players
Primeira Liga players
Liga Portugal 2 players
Segunda Divisão players
S.C.U. Torreense players
Vitória S.C. players
S.C. Olhanense players
Rio Ave F.C. players
G.D. Chaves players
F.C. Famalicão players
C.D. Trofense players
Liga I players
CFR Cluj players
Brazilian expatriate footballers
Expatriate footballers in Portugal
Expatriate footballers in Romania
Brazilian expatriate sportspeople in Portugal
Brazilian expatriate sportspeople in Romania